Eel Bay, previously known as Cape Negro, is a community in the Canadian province of Nova Scotia, located in the Municipality of the District of Barrington of Shelburne County.  Cape Sable, Nova Scotia By one account, Eel Bay was first settled by the French who migrated from Port Royal, Nova Scotia in 1720.  However other records indicate the habitation and garden of a French Priest at the Hawl Over (or Haulover) in Eel Bay as early as 1635, and the 1671 French census records the family of Amand and Elizabeth Lalloue living in Eel Bay.

History 
The cape was named by Samuel de Champlain, who wrote in 1604: "There is a harbour very good for vessels, and the head of it has a little river, which runs from a distance inland, which I named the port Cape Negro, on account of a rock which at a distance resembles one, four leagues from it and four from Port Mouton.  The cape is very dangerous on account of the rocks."

The first mention of permanent European habitation was that of a French Priest in 1635.  What remains of the 1671 French census indicates a family of seven (Amand Lalloue) living in Eel Bay, with a farm which included grain, peas and other vegetables as well as sizeable herds of goats and pigs.  Several Mi'kmaq families with children lived in Eel Bay, at least during the summer.

Practically all of the Acadians were expelled by the English / New England military forces by 1758, and the New England Planters began to settle the formerly Acadian farmland by 1760-1761.  The earliest New England Planters in Eel Bay were: Peleg Coffin, Sacco Barnes, Timothy Bryant, Samuel Knowles.

Although there was at one time a Cape Negro school and community hall, all that remains today are the Cape Negro Church (current building built 1853) and adjacent cemeteries (Seaview Cemetery, 1770.  Hillside Cemetery, 1958).  The remnants of the canal built at the Hawl Over also remain.  The Cape Negro Church has the distinction of having Freeborn Garrettson as one of its first ministers.

Name change 
In late 2016, an application was made to Nova Scotia Geographic Information Service to rename Cape Negro (and Cape Negro Island, Negro Harbour, Squaw Island). The change was awaiting Indigenous and community support.

The community itself was officially renamed on February 8, 2023 to Eel Bay. The name was selected by local residents. Name changes for the harbour, the island and the actual cape remain subject to consultation.

See also
 List of communities in Nova Scotia

References

Communities in Shelburne County, Nova Scotia
General Service Areas in Nova Scotia
Populated coastal places in Canada
1635 establishments in the French colonial empire